Glenea glechomoides is a species of beetle in the family Cerambycidae. It was described by Stephan von Breuning in 1982.

References

glechomoides
Beetles described in 1982